In Norse mythology, Eldhrímnir (Old Norse "fire-sooty") is the cauldron in which the cook of the gods, Andhrímnir, prepares Sæhrímnir every evening.

Notes

References
 Orchard, Andy (1997). Dictionary of Norse Myth and Legend. Cassell. 

Artifacts in Norse mythology
Cauldrons

fr:Eldhrímnir